Limoges Cercle Saint-Pierre, commonly referred to as Limoges CSP or CSP, is a French professional basketball club based in the city of Limoges.

History
The club was founded in 1929, but its peak was during the 1980s and 1990s, when they became the first French club to win a major European-wide title in a team sport, by winning the FIBA European League (EuroLeague) in 1993.

In the 1999–2000 season, Limoges won its 9th top-tier level French League title, but it was relegated to the French second division LNB Pro B, after winning it, because of financial problems. The club didn't get back to its old state for a long time, as it spent the next 3 years in the Pro A, but was relegated again in 2004. Starting with the 2004–05 season, Limoges played in the NM1, the French third division. It took the club six seasons to eventually return to the Pro A.

In the 2013–14 season, Limoges returned to its old glory, as the team captured its 10th French League national championship, by beating Strasbourg IG 0–3 in the French League Finals. Alex Acker was named Finals MVP.

The club thus qualified for the 2014–15 EuroLeague by winning the French League championship, which would be their first appearance in the top European-wide league in 17 seasons. In the EuroLeague, Limoges lost 8 out of 10 games, managing to win against UNICS and Cedevita, before being relegated to the European-wide second tier level EuroCup. In the EuroCup Round of 32, Limoges was eliminated, after finishing 3rd in Group J. In the French Pro A, Limoges once again had a successful season. In the regular season, Limoges finished in 3rd place behind JSF Nanterre and Strasbourg IG, but in the French League playoffs, they made up for that. In the French League Finals, Limoges beat Strasbourg 1–3, to win back-to-back French League titles. Ousmane Camara was named Finals MVP.

Arena

Limoges plays its home games at the Palais des Sports de Beaublanc, which has a seating capacity of 6,500 people.

Roster

Retired numbers

Current roster

Honours

Domestic competitions
 French League 
 Winners (11): 1982–83, 1983–84, 1984–85, 1987–88, 1988–89, 1989–90, 1992–93, 1993–94, 1999–00, 2013–14, 2014–15
 Runners-up (4): 1986–87, 1990–91, 1991–92, 1997–98
 French Cup
 Winners (1): 1999–00
 Runners-up (2): 2010–11, 2011–12
 Leaders Cup
 Winners (2): 1988, 1990
 Runners-up (2): 1991, 1992
 French Super Cup
 Winners (1): 2012
 Federation Cup (defunct)
 Winners (3): 1981–82, 1982–83, 1984–85
 League Cup (defunct)
 Winners (2): 1993–94, 1994–95
 French League Pro B
 Winners (2): 2000–01, 2011–12

European competitions
 EuroLeague
 Winners (1): 1992–93
 3rd place (1): 1989–90
 4th place (1): 1994–95
 Final Four (3): 1990, 1993, 1995
 FIBA Saporta Cup (defunct)
 Winners (1): 1987–88
 FIBA Korać Cup (defunct)
 Winners (3): 1981–82, 1982–83, 1999–00
 Runners-up (1): 1986–87
 European Basketball Club Super Cup (semi-official, defunct)
 Runners-up (1): 1985

Worldwide competitions
 McDonald's Championship
 3rd place (1): 1991
 4th place (1): 1993

Other competitions
 FIBA International Christmas Tournament (defunct)
 4th place (1): 1990
 Tournoi de Beaublanc 
 Winners (1): 2014
 Tournoi de Bourge
 Winners (1): 2014
 Tarere, France Invitational Game
 Winners (1): 2015
 St. Chamond & St. Étienne, France Invitational Game
 Winners (1): 2015

Individual club awards
 Small Triple Crown
 Winners (3): 1982–83, 1987–88, 1999–00

Successive shirts

Supporters and rivalries
The club has a large fan-base, with a dedicated ultras group called Ultras Green.

Their biggest rival is another legendary French club Pau-Orthez, and they have been trading blows with one another for national supremacy on the hardwood, both figuratively and literally, since the early 1980s. In the 22 seasons between 1983 and 2004, the two clubs combined for 18 French League championships, and multiple games between the two teams resulted in fights among the players, including one that ended in a brawl between Élan supporters and Limoges players, at the old Orthez venue, La Moutète.

Season by season
Season by season results of the club in national league, national cup and European-wide competitions.

International record

In European and worldwide competitions

The road to the European Cup victories 

1981–82 FIBA Korać Cup

1987–88 FIBA European Cup Winners' Cup

1999–00 FIBA Korać Cup

Notable players

  Gregor Beugnot
  Jim Bilba
  Yann Bonato
  Nobel Boungou Colo
  Axel Bouteille
  Ousmane Camara
  Richard Dacoury
  Yakhouba Diawara
  Sekou Doumbouya
  Stéphane Dumas
  Vasco Evtimov
  Apollo Faye
  Mickaël Gelabale
  Joseph Gomis
  William Howard
  Damien Inglis
  Mouhammadou Jaiteh
  Adrien Moerman
  Jacques Monclar
  Hugues Occansey
  Stéphane Ostrowski
  Johan Petro
  Jonathan Rousselle
  Thierry Rupert
  Jean-Michel Sénégal
  Steed Tchicamboud
  Ali Traoré
  Georges Vestris
  Frédéric Weis
  Léo Westermann
  Edin Bavčić
  Zack Wright
  João Paulo Batista
  Dwight Hardy
  John Amaechi
  Spencer Dunkley
  Ville Kaunisto
  Taurean Green
  Yassin Idbihi 
  Heiko Schaffartzik 
  Angelos Tsamis
  Jermaine Bucknor
  Pape-Philippe Amagou
  Fréjus Zerbo
  Samardo Samuels
  Siim-Sander Vene
  Bo McCalebb
  J. R. Reynolds
  Mathieu Wojciechowski
  Klemen Prepelič
  Jure Zdovc
  Radoslav Rančík
  Mileta Lisica
  Dragan Lukovski
  Branko Milisavljević
  Óscar Yebra
  Eugene "Pooh" Jeter
  Jerome Randle
  Alex Acker
  Tommy Adams
  Cedrick Banks
  Travarus Bennett
  Steffon Bradford
  Kevin Braswell
  Michael Brooks
  Anthony Brown 
  Marcus Brown
  Don Collins
  Brian Conklin
  Randy Culpepper
  Ramel Curry
  Will Daniels
  Leon Douglas
  Grant Gondrezick
  R.T. Guinn
  Kenny Hayes
  Dru Joyce
  Clarence Kea
  Billy Knight
  J. R. Koch
  Kyle McAlarney
  Kevin McGee
  George Montgomery
  Glenn Mosley
  Ed Murphy
  Zamal Nixon
  Mark Payne
  London Perrantes 
  Dawan Robinson
  Clinton Smith
  Jamar Smith
  Jordan Taylor
  Ronnie Taylor
  Carl Thomas
  Kelly Tripucka
  Joah Tucker
  Ty Walker
  Brad Wanamaker
  Harper Williams
  DaShaun Wood
  Michael Young

Head coaches

References

External links

 Official website
 Encyclocsp.eu 
 Beaublanc.com 

Basketball teams in France
Basketball teams established in 1929
EuroLeague-winning clubs